Philocoroebus is a genus of beetles in the family Buprestidae, the jewel beetles. They are native to the Philippines.

Species include:

 Philocoroebus adamantinus Bellamy, 1991
 Philocoroebus alius Bellamy, 1991
 Philocoroebus azureipennis (Obenberger, 1934)
 Philocoroebus banahaoensis (Obenberger, 1928)
 Philocoroebus cynaeoviridis (Fisher, 1922)
 Philocoroebus elongatus Bellamy, 1991
 Philocoroebus maquilingensis Bellamy, 1991
 Philocoroebus meliboeiformis (Saunders, 1874)
 Philocoroebus pseudocisseis Bellamy, 1991
 Philocoroebus purpureus Bellamy, 1991
 Philocoroebus samarensis Bellamy, 1991

References

Buprestidae genera